Bahal (also Romanized as Baḥal, Beḩal, and Beḩel) is a village in Jask Rural District, in the Central District of Jask County, Hormozgan Province, Iran. At the 2006 census, its population was 1,359, in 227 families.

References 

Populated places in Jask County